Urdués is a locality located in the municipality of Valle de Hecho, in Huesca province, Aragon, Spain. As of 2020, it has a population of 48.

Geography 
Urdués is located 110km north-northwest of Huesca.

References

Populated places in the Province of Huesca